Vermont lost one seat in reapportionment following the 1820 United States Census. For the 1822 election, Vermont switched back to using a single at-large district. This would be the last year that Vermont would use an at-large district until 1932, when its representation was reduced to a single seat. Vermont elected its members September 3, 1822.

See also 
 1822 and 1823 United States House of Representatives elections
 List of United States representatives from Vermont

1822
Vermont
United States House of Representatives